Miller County is a county located in the southwestern part of the U.S. state of Georgia. As of the 2020 census, the population was 6,000. The county seat is Colquitt. The county was created on February 26, 1856, and named after Andrew Jackson Miller (1806–56), president of the Medical College of Georgia.

Geography

The majority of Miller County, west of a north-to-south line made as a continuation of the eastern Early County border, is located in the Spring Creek sub-basin of the ACF River Basin (Apalachicola-Chattahoochee-Flint River Basin). The county's very northeastern corner is located in the Ichawaynochaway Creek sub-basin of the same ACF River Basin, while the southeastern portion, from just north of State Route 91 going south, is located in the Lower Flint River sub-basin of the same larger ACF River Basin.

Major highways

  U.S. Route 27
   State Route 1
  State Route 39
  State Route 45
  State Route 91
  State Route 91 Spur
  State Route 273
  State Route 310

Adjacent counties
 Baker County (northeast)
 Decatur County (southeast)
 Seminole County (southwest)
 Early County (northwest)

Demographics

2000 census
As of the census of 2000, there were 6,383 people, 2,487 households, and 1,765 families living in the county. The population density was 9/km2 (23/mi2). There were 2,770 housing units at an average density of 4/km2 (10/mi2). The racial makeup of the county was 70.26% White, 28.90% Black or African American, 0.17% Native American, 0.05% Asian, 0.08% Pacific Islander, 0.20% from other races, and 0.33% from two or more races. 0.69% of the population were Hispanic or Latino of any race.

There were 2,487 households, out of which 31.50% had children under the age of 18 living with them, 50.70% were married couples living together, 15.50% had a female householder with no husband present, and 29.00% were non-families. 26.70% of all households were made up of individuals, and 13.60% had someone living alone who was 65 years of age or older. The average household size was 2.51 and the average family size was 3.03.

In the county, the population was spread out, with 26.30% under the age of 18, 7.00% from 18 to 24, 26.20% from 25 to 44, 23.40% from 45 to 64, and 17.10% who were 65 years of age or older. The median age was 38 years. For every 100 females there were 89.10 males. For every 100 females age 18 and over, there were 83.90 males.

The median income for a household in the county was $27,335, and the median income for a family was $31,866. Males had a median income of $25,995 versus $20,886 for females. The per capita income for the county was $15,435. About 16.90% of families and 21.20% of the population were below the poverty line, including 28.70% of those under age 18 and 21.10% of those age 65 or over.

2010 census
As of the 2010 United States Census, there were 6,125 people, 2,426 households, and 1,674 families living in the county. The racial makeup of the county was 69.6% white, 28.1% black or African American, 0.5% Asian, 0.2% American Indian, 0.4% from other races, and 1.2% from two or more races. Those of Hispanic or Latino origin made up 1.5% of the population. In terms of ancestry, 14.2% were American, and 5.2% were Irish.

Of the 2,426 households, 32.2% had children under the age of 18 living with them, 49.1% were married couples living together, 15.6% had a female householder with no husband present, 31.0% were non-families, and 27.3% of all households were made up of individuals. The average household size was 2.46 and the average family size was 3.00. The median age was 41.7 years.

The median income for a household in the county was $33,196 and the median income for a family was $40,685. Males had a median income of $31,985 versus $29,110 for females. The per capita income for the county was $19,895. About 18.9% of families and 18.2% of the population were below the poverty line, including 22.3% of those under age 18 and 16.1% of those age 65 or over.

2020 census

As of the 2020 United States census, there were 6,000 people, 2,333 households, and 1,556 families residing in the county.

Education

The Miller County School District operates public schools serving residents of the county.

Communities
 Boykin
 Colquitt

Politics

See also

 National Register of Historic Places listings in Miller County, Georgia 
List of counties in Georgia

References

External links
 Miller County Board of Commissioners  Official Website
 Miller County Liberal official website of newspaper founded in 1897 by Zula Brown Toole

 
Georgia (U.S. state) counties
1856 establishments in Georgia (U.S. state)
Populated places established in 1856